This is a list of the rivers of Fiji.  
They are listed by island in clockwise order, starting at the north end of each island.  Tributaries are listed under the parent stream.

Gau
Wailevu River (Gau)

Ovalau
Lovoni River

Taveuni
Somosomo Creek
Tavoro Creek
Waibula River

Vanua Levu
Boda River
Bua River
Buca River
Bucaisau River
Dama River
Dreketi River
Nabiti River
Naua River
Drawa River
Lutukina River
Navuturerega River
Korovuli River
Nakorotolutolu River
Nanenivuda River
Nasuva River
Seaqaqa River
Vunibelebele River
Galogalo River
Kasavu River
Kilaka River
Korolevu River
Korotasere River
Labasa River
Wairikicake River
Wairikiqisi River
Lagalaga River
Lakeba River
Lekutu River
Kavula River
Nadamanu River
Nawailevu River
Mataniwai River
Naiselesele River
Nakura River
Nala River
Koroivonu River
Nalomate River
Naqereqere River
Nasavu River
Nasekawa River
Drakaniwai River
Nasoni River
Natoavou River
Navilagolago River
Nubu River
Qaloyaqa River
Qawa River
Sarowaqa River
Tavua River
Suetabu River
Tabia River
Tibitibi River
Togolevu River
Vaturova River
Vunivia River
Vuniyaro River
Wailevu River (Vanua Levu)
Wainikoro River
Nadogo River
Nalagi River
Wainunu River
Dawacumu River
Nabuna River
Navilevu River
Yanawai River

Viti Levu
Ba River
Dawasamu River
Deuba River
Kubuna River
Lami River
Lobau River
Nadi River
Malakua River
Namata River
Nasilai River
Nasinu River
Nasivi River
Saravi River
Navua River
Wainikoroiluva River ('Luva River)
Veinuqa River
Navuloa River
Penang River
Nakauvadra River
Qaraniqio River
Rewa River
Nasoata River
Toga River
Vunidawa River
Waidina River
Waimanu River
Wainibuka River
Nasoqo River
Wailoa River
Waisomo River
Wainimala River
Lawaki River
Rukuruku River
Sabeto River
Samabula River
Savu River
Sigatoka River
Namada River
Sovi River
Tamavua River
Taunovo River
Toguru River
Tuva River
Vatuwaqa River
Veisari River
Vitogo River
Vuda River
Waibula River (Viti Levu)
Waimaro River
Wainivesi River
Waidalici River
Waidamu River
Wainadoi River
Yaqara River

References
GEOnet Names Server

 
Rivers
Fiji